Ḥassān al-Ḥimyāri (Hassan Yuha'min Ibn Abi Karib Asad Ibn Hassan Malikikarib Yuha'min  ), was a king of the Himyarite Kingdom known for leading the genocide of an ancient tribe of Arabia called the Jadīs; the genocide led to the tribe's extinction.

Hassan and Jadis
According to Arab historians, Tasm and Jadis were from "the extinct Arab" tribes. Tasm was an ally of Saba'. Tasm took over Jadis. The king of Tasm's name was ‘Imliq. He used to deflower the brides of Jadis before they get married. Later Imliq was assassinated by someone from the tribe of Jadis. A person called Riyah from Tasm ran to Yemen asking for help from their ally. At that time Tubba Asad Abu Malik-karib was the king of Yemen. He asked his son Hassan to help Tasm. Hassan al-Himyari prepared an army and went to fight Jadis. 

There was a woman in Jadis called Zarqaa al-Yamamah. She was able to see a person from a distance of three days. Riyah told Hassan about Zarqaa al-Yamamah. 

Hassan sent a spy to see the tribe of Jadis. While that spy was looking for the tribe of Jadis he stepped on a thorn. While he was trying to remove it, Zarqaa al-Yamamah noticed him and warned her tribe saying: "oh my people, I see a person on the mountain and I think he is a spy", the Jadisites asked her "what is he doing?" she said: "He is either eating something or looking for his shoes". The Jadisites didn't believe her.

Riyah told Hassan to take palms and hide his army behind them and that this should be done at night. Hassan asked: "Can she see at night?" Riyah replied: "She sees better at night".

Hassan ordered his army to hide behind palms, each one of them should hide behind a palm. The army of Hassan went in the morning to Jadis.

Zarqaa al-Yamamah noticed the army of Hassan and told her people: "Oh people of Jadis, either the trees or the horses of Himyar are coming". The Jadisites didn't believe her. Hassan al-Himyari killed all of the men and women of Jadis and took the children as slaves. The army of Hassan brought al-Yamamah to him, he ordered that her eyes be taken out. They found black veins in her eyes. Hassan asked al-Yamamah: "What is this in your eyes?" she replied: "This a Kohl called al-Thmad".

Hassan's death
Hassan invaded northern areas in Arabia along with the Yemeni Aqayls (rulers of the autonomous kingdoms of Yemen). Hassan was irritable. He used to take all the goods from the wars for himself without sharing with the Aqyals.

In a certain spot in the land of Iraq, the Aqyals refused to go with Hassan any further. They wanted to return to their homeland and families. The Aqyals of Yemen met with each other and decided to convince Hassan's brother, 'Amr, to kill Hassan. One of the Aqyals called Dhu Raʿyn al-Himyari didn't agree with the other Aqyals. According to Nashwan al-Himyari, Dhu Raʿyn was from a noble family in Himyar.

The Aqyals told ʿAmr to kill his brother and they will make him the king after his brother. ʿAmr agreed with their plan. Dhu Raʿyn forbade ʿAmr from killing his brother saying, "You are the ruling house of our kingdom; do not kill your brother and thereby dissolve the uniting bonds of our house". ʿAmr rejected Dhu Raʿyn advice. Later Dhu Raʿyn wrote a poem in a piece of leaf and gave it to ʿAmr. He asked ʿAmr not to open it.

Hassan heard that the Aqyals and his brother were conspiring against him. He recited to ʿAmr,

After a period of time, Hassan went for hunting. He returned to his house and fell asleep. ʿAmr entered Hassan's room and took the sword and killed his brother.

ʿAmr returned to the Aqails who slew him out of fear lest they be kept at military service while assuring him, "No harm, no harm!", "Your dead one was the best of us and your living one is lord over us, while all of you are chiefs". ʿAmr pulled all the Himyar army from Iraq and returned with the Aqyals back to Yemen. One Himyari poet said, 

After ʿAmr returned to Yemen he was unable to sleep and suffered from permanent insomnia. He brought the physicians and the soothsayers and diviners who work by examining physiognomy and told them that he can't sleep. One of them replied, "By God, no man has ever killed his brother or a blood relation wrongfully, as you killed your brother, without losing his sleep and incurring sleeplessness."

After ʿAmr heard that, he immediately called all of those Aqyals who urged him to kill his brother. He ordered the executioner to behead them all in the same room. The executioner was beheading them until he arrived at Dhu Raʿyn, Dhu Raʿyn asked ʿAmr to open the letter he gave him. ʿAmr opened the letter and saw the poem that Dhu Raʿyn wrote which says, 

After ʿAmr finished reading the letter, Dhu Raʿyn said: "Didn't I ask you not to kill your brother?". ʿAmr told the executioner not to execute Dhu Raʿyn.

See also
Dhu Shanatir

Sources

References

 

History of Yemen
History of Saudi Arabia
Kings of Himyar
Year of death unknown
Year of birth unknown
Middle Eastern kings
400 births
5th-century Arabs